Boris Becker was the defending champion, but lost in the final to Pete Sampras. The score was 7–6(7–2), 3–6, 6–3.

Seeds
The first eight seeds received a bye into the second round.

Draw

Finals

Top half

Section 1

Section 2

Bottom half

Section 3

Section 4

References

External links
 Official results archive (ATP)
 Official results archive (ITF)

1991 Singles
GTE U.S. Men's Hard Court Championships,1991,Singles